Rheme may refer to:

 In semiotics, a sign that represents its object with respect to quality; see 
 In linguistics, what is being said about a topic; see Theme–rheme

See also
 Rhema, a Greek word meaning a thing said